Jean Prahm (formerly Jean Racine, born September 20, 1978) is an American bobsledder who competed from 1996 to 2006. She won three medals in the two-woman event at the FIBT World Championships with two silvers (2000, 2001) and a bronze (2004). Prahm, then known by her maiden name of Jean Racine, won the Bobsleigh World Cup season title in the two-woman event both in 1999-2000 and 2000–1. Earned the nickname "mean jean" after kicking off her bobsled partner just prior to the 2002 Olympics.

Prahm competed in the Olympics twice in the women's bobsleigh doubles, in 2002 and 2006. In 2002, Prahm competed in women's bobsledding during its first appearance as an Olympic sport. Prahm and her partner, Gea Johnson, finished fifth. In 2006, in Torino, Italy, Prahm finished in sixth place.

A native of Waterford, Michigan, Prahm is also a business major at the University of Utah and is pursuing a singing career.

Today, Prahm lives in North Liberty, Iowa with her husband and three children. She also serves as an athlete representative for the selection team for the United States women's bobsled teams.

References

Jean Prahm Official Bio 
2002 bobsleigh two-woman results
2006 bobsleigh two-woman results
Bobsleigh two-woman world championship medalists since 2000
FIBT profile
List of two-woman bobsleigh World Cup champions since 1995
United States Olympic Committee profile

1978 births
Living people
American female bobsledders
Bobsledders at the 2002 Winter Olympics
Bobsledders at the 2006 Winter Olympics
Olympic bobsledders of the United States
People from Waterford, Michigan
People from Park City, Utah
Sportspeople from Michigan
University of Utah alumni
Sportspeople from Iowa City, Iowa
21st-century American women